Delta Librae, Latinized from δ Librae, is a variable star in the constellation Libra.  It has the traditional name Zuben Elakribi, a variant of the traditional name of Gamma Librae.  With μ Virginis it forms one of the Akkadian lunar mansions Mulu-izi(meaning "Man-of-fire").

δ Librae is approximately 300 light years from the Earth and the primary, component A, belongs to the spectral class B9.5V, indicating it is a B-type main-sequence star. It is visible to the naked eye with an apparent visual magnitude of 4.93 and is moving closer to the Sun with a radial velocity of −39 km/s. This is an Algol-like eclipsing binary star system, with a period of 2.3274 days and an eccentricity of 0.07. Its apparent magnitude varies from 4.91m to 5.9m. The secondary is filling its Roche lobe and there is evidence of large-scale mass transfer in the past, with the star being more evolved than the primary.

Along with λ Tauri, it was one of the first stars on which 
rotational line broadening was observed, by Frank Schlesinger in 1911.

References

Algol variables
B-type main-sequence stars
Eclipsing binaries
Zuben Elakribi
Libra (constellation)
Librae, Delta
Durchmusterung objects
Librae, 19
132742
073473
5586